Richard Ian Boldsworth (27 June 1973, in Warrington, England), previously known under the pseudonym Ray Peacock, is a comic performer, best known for The ParaPod,  The Peacock and Gamble Podcast and the Ray Peacock Podcast. He came to prominence in The Big and Daft comedy trio, BBC London radio series, three consecutive years of sell-out Edinburgh Festival Fringe shows and their own series on UK Play, Terrorville.

Career
Boldsworth made his debut at the Edinburgh Festival in 2002, originally as a brash Yorkshireman character named Ray Peacock who soon became a regular act on the live circuit. In his 2006 show at the Edinburgh Festival, the character was dropped in all but name and a confessional stand-up show entitled "Out of Character" was delivered.

In 2007 Boldsworth began presenting his iTunes & Chortle hosted The Ray Peacock Podcast alongside fellow comedians Ed Gamble and former EastEnders  actor Raji James. It was later succeeded by The Peacock and Gamble Podcast, which is also hosted by Chortle.

Launched on 8 June 2009, The Peacock and Gamble Podcast was Boldsworth's second foray into the medium of podcasting. Released every Monday, the show was a comedic insight in the two's lives and experiences. It can be found free on the iTunes Store, and also on Chortle. Kings Place in London hosted a large scale live show version of the show in December 2009, which featured Nick Mohammed in supporting roles. Bumper two-hour shows commencing on 24 February 2011 at Kings Place, London – "Peacock & Gamble Emergency Broadcast" touring the UK from July 2011 (including a full run at the Pleasance during the Edinburgh Fringe). The show was based on the concept that the "real" show has been halted, so Ray and Ed take over and fill the time so the audience still have a show to watch.

Early shows have featured a seance, a guide to world culture, a re-creation of the Stanford experiment, a tribute to Sister Act, and live Guitar Hero. The Kings Place shows were also notable for their live Twitter take-overs, where Ray and Ed hack into an audience members account during the interval. A limited Edinburgh run took place every Sunday of the 2011 Fringe. The show ended with a live podcast at Kings Place on 8 December 2011. It was reincarnated for daily episodes in the 2012 and 2013 Edinburgh Festivals with a new format with a different special guest each day. In 2013, BBC Radio 4 commissioned a pilot of Emergency Broadcast.

Boldsworth co-presented a 3-season paranormal podcast, The ParaPod, with comedian Barry Dodds, in which they explore and debunk reports of paranormal activity and conspiracy theories which Dodds brings to each episode. The three series consisted of 30 episodes and, as of April 2018, has been downloaded over 2 million times.

He also presents a mental health podcast The Mental Podcast for which he won the digital champion award 2017 from mental health charity Mind. In addition he has presented Some Nonsense Fubar Radio show and podcast, and since 2017 has written weekly short stories for 4000 Words podcast released by Infinite Hermit Productions on Patreon.

In April 2018 Boldsworth announced the upcoming release of The Parapod Movie, in which he and comedian Barry Dodds travel around the UK in a hearse with Dodds attempting to convince Boldsworth of the existence of ghosts. On general release it will become the first ever podcast to be transferred to movie format.

In September 2013, Boldsworth hosted a three-hour radio show on BBC Radio 4 Extra dedicated to comedy icon Les Dawson.

Work

Live
 "Ray Peacock – Here Comes Trouble UK TOUR" – 2014 – 2015
 "Ray Peacock – Here Comes Trouble" – Edinburgh Fringe 2014
 "Peacock & Gamble Heart-Throbs UK TOUR" –  2013
 "Peacock & Gamble Heart-Throbs" – Edinburgh Fringe 2013
 "Peacock & Gamble Don't Even Want To Be on Telly Anyway UK TOUR" – 2012 – 2013
 "Peacock & Gamble Don't Even Want To Be on Telly Anyway" – Edinburgh Fringe 2012
 "Peacock & Gamble Emergency Broadcast UK TOUR" – 2011
 "Peacock & Gamble Emergency Broadcast" – Edinburgh Fringe 2011
 "Peacock & Gamble Podcast Live" – Edinburgh Fringe 2011
 "Peacock & Gamble Emergency Broadcast" – London Residency, Kings Place 2011
 "The Ray Peacock Podcast Live" 2008
 "Ray Peacock – Out of Character" – Edinburgh Fringe 2006
 "Edinburgh & Beyond" – with Russell Howard, Russell Kane, Reginald D Hunter – Edinburgh Fringe and National Tour 2005
 "Ray Peacock & Son" – Edinburgh Fringe 2005
 "The Comedy Zone" – Edinburgh Fringe 2002
 "Big And Daft UK TOUR" with Rob Rouse & Jon Williams – Tour 2001
 "The Big And Daft Christmas Show" with Rob Rouse & Jon Williams – Edinburgh Fringe 2001
 "Big And Daft in Space" with Rob Rouse & Jon Williams – Edinburgh Fringe 2000
 "Big And Daft" with Rob Rouse & Jon Williams – Edinburgh Fringe 1999

TV studio audience warm-up
 Red Dwarf (The Promised Land- 2019)
 Red Dwarf (Series 12 Dave – 2016)
 Red Dwarf (Series 11 Dave – 2015)
 Taskmaster (Dave – 2015)
 Russell Howard's Stand Up Central (Comedy Central – 2015)
 Brotherhood (Comedy Central – 2015)
 Russell Howard's Good News (BBC – 2009–2015)
 Not Going Out (BBC – 2007–2014)
 A Short History of Everything Else (Channel 4 – 2012)
 Red Dwarf (Series 10; Dave – 2011–2012)
 Frankie Boyle's Rehabilitation Programme (Channel 4 – 2011)
 That Sunday Night Show (Series 2; ITV – 2011)
 Lee Nelson's Well Good Show (Series 2; BBC – 2011)
 Felix and Murdo Pilot (C4 – 2011)
 Al Murray's Compete for the Meat (BBC – 2011)
 That Sunday Night Show (ITV – 2011)
 Lee Mack's All Star Cast (BBC – 2010–2011)
 The Count Arthur Strong Game Show (BBC – 2010)
 Richard Bacon's Beer & Pizza Club (ITV – 2010)
 The Stephen K Amos Show (BBC – 2010)
 The IT Crowd Series IV (C4 – 2010)
 The Graham Norton Show (BBC – 2010)
 Miranda (BBC – 2009)
 Friday Night With Jonathan Ross (BBC – 2009–2010)
 The IT Crowd Series III (C4 – 2008)
 Harry Hill's TV Burp (ITV – 2008)
 Harry Hill's Soapington Way (ITV – 2007)
 The Consultants (2007)
 French & Saunders (BBC – 2007)
 Deal or No Deal (C4 – 2007–2008)
 Bremner, Bird and Fortune (C4 – 2006)
 Nigella (ITV – 2006)

TV
 Steve in  Red Dwarf (Dave- 2017)
 Ray in Live at the Electric (BBC – 2012)
 MC in Not Going Out (BBC – 2012)
 Peacock & Gamble in Russell Howard's Good News (BBC – 2011)
 Himself in "The Many Faces of Les Dawson" (BBC – 2011)
 Various in Russell Howard's Good News (BBC – 2011)
 Ray in "Warm Up" (BBC – 2011)
 Himself in Most Annoying People 2010 (BBC – 2010)
 Himself (stand-up) in Russell Howard's Good News (BBC – 2010)
 Roger in Skins (C4 – 2009)
 Darren in No Heroics (ITV – 2008)
 Banto in Doctor Who (credited as Ian Boldsworth) (BBC – 2007)
 Billy Taft in Doctors (credited as Ian Boldsworth) (BBC – 2006)
 DI Penhaligon in Cracker (credited as Ian Boldsworth) (ITV – 2006)
 Ray Peacock on Edinburgh & Beyond (Paramount – 2005)
 Ray Peacock in Paramount Shorts (Paramount – 2005)
 Garth in Skin Deep (credited as Ian Boldsworth) (C4 – 2005)
 Programme Consultant on Les Dawson's Finest Hour (C4 – 2002)
 Ian in Terrorville (credited as Ian Boldsworth) (BBC UKPlay – 2001)

Radio
 Ian Boldsworth Show – Fubar Radio (2016–present)
 Some Nonsense With Ray Peacock – Fubar Radio (2014–2016)
 Barnes & Peacock Do Sex – Fubar Radio (2014)
 Peacock & Gamble – Fubar Radio (2014)
 Great Lives – Radio 4 (2014)
 Listen to Les Dawson – Radio 4 (2013)
 Peacock & Gamble Emergency Broadcast – Radio 4 (2013)
 The Comedy Club on Radio 4 Extra (2011–2013)
 Big And Daft – BBC London (2001)

Podcasts
 The Ray Peacock Podcast – 2007
 The Peacock and Gamble Podcast – 2009
 The Parapod – 2017
 The Mental Podcast – 2017
 Jim Won't Give Ian His VR – 2017
 4000 Words – 2018

Films
 The ParaPod: A Very British Ghost Hunt - 2020

Awards
 Internet Award (nominated) – Chortle Awards 2011, 2013, 2016, 2017
 Best Compere (nominated) – Chortle Awards 2012, 2014
 Best Online Comedy (winner) – Midlands Comedy Awards 2016
 Best Podcast (nominated) – Ockham Awards 2017
 Digital Champion (winner) – Mind Mental Health Awards 2017

References

External links
 

1973 births
Living people
Alumni of Bretton Hall College
People from Warrington
English male comedians
English podcasters
English male actors